United Brethren Church, also known as Pleasant Hill Chapel is a church in Union County, South Dakota. It was built in 1905 and was added to the National Register of Historic Places in 2001.

It is a one-and-a-half-story gable-front clapboard building built on a clay tile foundation.  A steeple is centered in its front facade. It was built by carpenters Matson and Buum.

See also
United Brethren Church in Christ, built 1880 in Hutchinson County, South Dakota), also NRHP-listed

References

Churches on the National Register of Historic Places in South Dakota
Gothic Revival church buildings in South Dakota
Churches completed in 1905
Churches in Union County, South Dakota
Brethren church buildings
National Register of Historic Places in Union County, South Dakota
1905 establishments in South Dakota